Putney is an unincorporated community in Brown County, in the U.S. state of South Dakota.

History
A post office called Putney was established in 1887, and remained in operation until 1963. The community took its name from Putney, Vermont, the native home of a first settler.

References

Unincorporated communities in Brown County, South Dakota
Unincorporated communities in South Dakota